Olopatadine/mometasone, sold under the brand name Ryaltris, is a fixed-dose combination medication for the treatment of allergic rhinitis and rhinoconjunctivitis in adults and adolescents twelve years of age and older. It contains olopatadine hydrochloride and mometasone furoate monohydrate. It is sprayed into the nose.

Common side effects include an unpleasant taste (dysgeusia).

It was approved for medical use in Australia in December 2019, and in the United States in January 2022.

References

External links 
 
 
 
 

Combination drugs